The 2007–08 Superliga Femenina started on 8 September 2007 and ended on 20 April 2008.

Levante achieved their fourth title.

Teams and locations

League table

Results

Top scorer
List of Spanish Superliga 2007/08

References

External links
Season on soccerway

Primera División (women) seasons
Spa
1
women